Keep It Simple is a 2008 solo studio album by singer/songwriter Van Morrison.

Keep It Simple may also refer to:

KISS Principle
Keep It Simple (Curtis Fuller album), 2005
Keep It Simple (Keb' Mo' album), 2005
Keep It Simple (Mohamed Ali album), 2009
"Keep It Simple" (Delays song), 2008
"Keep It Simple" (James Barker Band song), 2019